The 2013 Campeonato da Primera Divisåo de Profissionais - Módulo I (official name: Campeonato Mineiro Chevrolet 2013), better known as 2013 Campeonato Mineiro, was the 99th season of Minas Gerais' top-flight football league. The season began on January 27 and ended on May 19. Atlético Mineiro were the champions for the 42nd time.

Format
The format is the same from the previous season. The first stage is a single round robin. The top four teams will be qualified to the playoffs, and the bottom two teams will be relegated to the 2014 Módulo II.

Teams

First stage

Results

Playoffs

Top goalscorers

References

2013
Mineiro